Community Christian School is a PreK–12 private, college preparatory Christian school in Bradenton, Florida, United States that was established in 1968 by Community Baptist Church.

Accreditation
Community Christian School is a member of the Sunshine State Association of Christian Schools (SSACS) and the American Association of Christian Schools (AACS). CCS is nationally accredited by the American Association of Christian Schools (AACS) and regionally accredited through the North American Christian School Accrediting Agency (NACSAA).

History
Community Baptist Church started Community Christian School in the fall of 1968. Enrollment quickly grew from fifty-seven students to over three hundred students. The kindergarten and elementary building was completed for the 1970–1971 school year. The Carolyn Musgrave Fellowship Hall was completed in 1976. The office and administration building and classrooms were completed in April 1981. Our present auditorium and classroom complex was completed in March 1985. The baseball and soccer complex was completed that same year. In 2017, major renovation on the gymnasium/cafeteria complex and construction on the new administration building were completed.

Community Christian is known for their strong fine arts department. High school band and choir have consistently placed 1st or 2nd at national competition over the past several years.

In 2017, Community's band won first place at the American Association of Christian Schools' competition in Greenville, South Carolina. Students Katelynn Moore and Aubree Zern placed first in art and voice respectively.

Campus 
A 40-acre campus includes several classroom buildings, an office complex, auditorium, air-conditioned gymnasium, full-sized athletic fields and large playground areas.

On January 15, 2016, the school broke ground on a multi-building construction and renovation project which included new administration offices, locker rooms, and major renovations to its gymnasium/cafeteria complex.

The school opened its brand new multi-purpose administrative building on August 30, 2017. The new facility includes educational offices, three conference rooms, locker rooms, athletic director's office, and referee rooms. Renovations to the gymnasium and the cafeteria were completed in 2018.

References

Baptist schools in the United States
Christian schools in Florida
Private schools in Florida
Schools in Manatee County, Florida
Educational institutions established in 1968
1968 establishments in Florida